Van Province may refer to:

Van Province, one of the provinces of the Republic of Turkey
Van Eyalet, one of the eyalet of the Ottoman Empire
Van Vilayet, one of the vilayet of the Ottoman Empire